Hallelujah Anyhow is the eighth studio album by American band Hiss Golden Messenger. It was released on September 22, 2017 under Merge Records.

Critical reception
Hallelujah Anyhow was met with generally favorable reviews from critics. At Metacritic, which assigns a weighted average rating out of 100 to reviews from mainstream publications, this release received an average score of 80, based on 15 reviews.

Accolades

Track listing

Charts

References

2017 albums
Hiss Golden Messenger albums
Merge Records albums